The seventh series of Geordie Shore, a British television programme based in Newcastle upon Tyne, was announced on 5 July 2013 after cast members Holly Hagan and Vicky Pattison had been arrested for assault on a night out during filming. The series began on 17 September 2013, just three weeks after Series 6 had concluded, and finished airing on 22 October 2013 after six episodes. This series had a shorter run that usual due to filming being postponed after the night of the assault. It was reported that filming for the series began on 26 June 2013 as the cast members had all been absent from Twitter since then. This was the last series to feature Sophie Kasaei after she was axed from the series following a racial slur. It was also the first series to feature Sophie's cousin, Marnie Simpson and included the brief return of Jay Gardner, who had previously featured in series one to three, and again during the sixth series for two episodes. Following Vicky's arrest, she was absent from the final half of the series. This series included the cast members taking part in a number of activities on their bucket list, new cast member Marnie isolating herself after breaking up the friendship between Gaz and Scott, and Jay returning to fix the drift between the cast members.

Cast
 Charlotte-Letitia Crosby
 Gary Beadle
 Holly Hagan
 James Tindale
 Jay Gardner
 Marnie Simpson
 Scott Timlin
Sophie Kasaei
 Vicky Pattison

Duration of cast 
{| class="wikitable" style="text-align:center; width:40%;"
|-
! rowspan="2" style="width:15%;" | Cast members
|-
! style="text-align:center; width:10%;" | 1
! style="text-align:center; width:10%;" | 2
! style="text-align:center; width:10%;" | 3
! style="text-align:center; width:10%;" | 4
! style="text-align:center; width:10%;" | 5
! style="text-align:center; width:10%;" | 6
|-
! Charlotte
!style="background:#959FFD;"|
!style="background:#93f;"|
!style="background:#959FFD;"|
!style="background:#959FFD;"|
!style="background:#959FFD;"|
!style="background:#f0f;"|
|-
! Gaz
!style="background:#98FF98;"|
!style="background:#959FFD;"|
!style="background:#959FFD;"|
!style="background:#959FFD;"|
!style="background:#959FFD;"|
!style="background:#959FFD;"|
|-
! Holly
!style="background:#959FFD;"|
!style="background:#959FFD;"|
!style="background:#959FFD;"|
!style="background:#959FFD;"|
!style="background:#959FFD;"|
!style="background:#959FFD;"|
|-
! James
!style="background:#98FF98;"|
!style="background:#959FFD;"|
!style="background:#93f;"|
!style="background:#959FFD;"|
!style="background:#959FFD;"|
!style="background:#959FFD;"|
|-
! Jay
!colspan="3" style="background:gray;"|
!style="background:#01DF3A;"|
!style="background:#00FFFF;"|
!style="background:gray;"|
|-
! Marnie
!style="background:#ff0;"|
!style="background:#959FFD;"|
!style="background:#959FFD;"|
!style="background:#f0f;"|
!style="background:#98FF98;"|
!style="background:#959FFD;"|
|-
! Scotty T
!style="background:#959FFD;"|
!style="background:#93f;"|
!style="background:#959FFD;"|
!style="background:#93f;"|
!style="background:#959FFD;"|
!style="background:#959FFD;"|
|-
! Sophie
!style="background:#959FFD;"|
!style="background:#959FFD;"|
!style="background:#FF8000;"|
!colspan="3" style="background:gray;"|
|-
! Vicky
!style="background:#959FFD;"|
!style="background:#959FFD;"|
!style="background:#FA8072;"|
!style="background:lightgrey;"|
!style="background:lightgrey;"|
!style="background:lightgrey;"|
|-
|}

Episodes

Ratings

References

2013 British television seasons
Series 07